Mistilteinn ("Mistletoe"), also known as Misteltein or Mystletainn, is Hrómundr Gripsson's sword in Hrómundar saga Gripssonar, a legendary saga from Iceland.

Mistilteinn first belonged to Þráinn, who had been king in Valland before he retired in his burial mound with his wealth.

The Danish king Óláfr and his men, among whom Hrómundr Gripsson, learnt about that and found the barrow. Þráinn, who had become a draugr (living dead), was sitting inside. No one but Hrómundr dared to enter. After a long and fierce fight, he defeated Þráinn and took his treasure, especially his sword, with which Þráinn had killed four hundred and twenty men, including the Swedish king Semingr.

Hrómundr used Mistilteinn during the battle between Óláfr and two Swedish kings both named Haldingr. He killed Helgi inn frækni (the Valiant), who had slain his brothers. He then lost Mistilteinn in the water out of witchcraft. He deeply felt this loss but soon recovered his sword, which was found in the stomach of a pike. But Mistilteinn was of no help when he fought king Haldingr, whom he eventually killed with a club.

In popular culture 

The housing area of squad 13 in the popular anime Darling in the Franxx is called Mistilteinn.
In the popular trading card game Yu-gi-oh, Dragunity Arma Mystletainn is a monster card of the Dragunity archetype.
In the video game series Fire Emblem Mystletainn is the name of the sword wielded by Eldigan and later his son Ares in Fire Emblem: Genealogy of the Holy War. An imitation of the sword later appears in Fire Emblem: Awakening under the name Missiletainn. A tome in Fire Emblem: Fates is also named Missiletainn.
Mistilteinn is the final weapon in the video game Ys VIII: Lacrimosa of Dana.
Mistilteinn is a weapon which can be crafted in the video game Eternal Return (video game).
Mistilteinn is an obtainable weapon in Granblue Fantasy mobile game.
Mistilteinn is an obtainable weapon in video game Bloodstained: Ritual of the Night.
Mistilteinn is an obtainable weapon in the video game Final Fantasy XIII. It appears as a staff rather than a sword. It also appears as a staff in MMORPG Final Fantasy XIV, available to White Mage players.
Misteltein is the name of a playable character in the MMORPG Closers.
In the video game series Castlevania, an entry called Aria of Sorrow and its sequel, Dawn of Sorrow, have a sword called Mystletainn, referencing this weapon.
The Secret Art of Mistilteinn is a strike used by Arin Kannazuki in Trinity Seven using her weapon, Gae Bolg.
In the anime adaptation of the manga Dream Eater Merry, a character named Mystletainn is introduced as a major antagonist
In the manga Black Clover, the Golden Dawn Captain, William Vangeance, uses an ability called World Tree Magic: Great Mistilteinn Tree to replace Yami's sword.
In the anime Is This A Zombie? the Magical Garment Girl Haruna uses a sentient magical pink chainsaw called Mystletainn. Her ultimate attack is "Mystletainn Kick", which is actually a powerful chainsaw slash, not a kick. It also allows protagonist Ayumu Aikawa to transform into a magical garment girl.
In the anime Infinite Stratos S2, the head of the student council, Tatenashi Sarashiki uses an attack called Lance of Mistilteinn.
In the manga Project ARMS, created by Kyoichi Nanatsuki and Ryoji Minagawa, the character Hayato Shingu, one of the protagonists, can transform in a powerful armored knight whose lance, the "Lance of Mistilteinn", can destroy other ARMS with an Anti-ARMS Nano-Virus.
In the Mobile Nintendo Game Dragalia Lost, Mistilteinn is available as a five star shadow spear that you can craft in game.
In the popular Minecraft server Minewind, Mysteltainn is an obtainable sword.
Mystletainn is an obtainable artifact in European War V mobile game.
Used in God of War.
In the video game Warriors Orochi 4 and its expansion, Mistilteinn is the main weapon for both Perseus and Loki.
In the video game Kirby's Return to Dreamland Deluxe, Mistilteinn is part of the name for the final boss theme of the side mode "Magolor Epilogue."

References 

Baldr
Mythological Norse weapons
Mythological swords